Anna-Lena Schwing (born 1996 in Bremen) is a German actress.

Life and professional career
Anna-Lena Schwing attended the Waldorf School in the district of Schwachhausen in Bremen, where she was on stage for the first time as the "beast", in The Beauty and the Beast, as part of a school performance of the Theater-AG in 2011.

Schwing attended the New Talent Drama School and has been coached in acting by Patrick Dreikauss since 2012. She has been studying at the Art of Acting Studio in Los Angeles since 2016.  In 2013, she played with the Junges.Theater (MoKS) division of Theater Bremen in Wir sind diejenigen, which was developed by the participants themselves.

Also in 2013, Schwing gave her debut in front of the camera. In the episodes "Geocaching" and "In der Tonne" from the TV series Die Pfefferkörner, she played the role of Corinna, a fellow schoolmate of die Pfefferkörner.

Personal information
Anna-Lena Schwing lives in Bremen, plays piano, rides, sails and practices archery.

Filmography
 2013: Die Pfefferkörner: Geocaching
 2013: Die Pfefferkörner: In die Tonne
 2014: In Your Dreams – season one
 2014: Großstadtrevier: Der gute Bulle
 2015: Cologne P.D.: Camilla und die tote Nonne
 2015: Engel der Gerechtigkeit – Geld oder Leben
 2015: : Wahrheiten
 2015: In Your Dreams – season two
 2016: Familie Dr. Kleist: Aller Anfang

References

External links
 

Living people
1996 births
Actors from Bremen
German child actresses
German film actresses
German television actresses